Arthur Watts (1911–1962) was an English former freestyle swimmer who competed for Great Britain in the 1928 Summer Olympics.

In 1928 he was eliminated in the first round of the 400 metre freestyle event.

Two years later he won the silver medal with the English team in 4×200 yards freestyle relay competition at the 1930 Empire Games.

See also
 List of Commonwealth Games medallists in swimming (men)

External links
Arthur Watts' profile at Sports Reference.com

English male freestyle swimmers
Olympic swimmers of Great Britain
Swimmers at the 1928 Summer Olympics
Swimmers at the 1930 British Empire Games
Commonwealth Games silver medallists for England
Commonwealth Games medallists in swimming
1911 births
1962 deaths
Medallists at the 1930 British Empire Games